Stańczyk (Full title: Stańczyk during a ball at the court of Queen Bona in the face of the loss of Smolensk) is a painting by Jan Matejko finished in 1862. This painting was acquired by the Warsaw National Museum in 1924. During World War II it was looted by the Nazis and subsequently by the Soviet Union, but was returned to Poland around 1956.

It is one of Matejko's most famous works and the one that launched him to fame. It has been described by the Warsaw National Museum as one of the most recognizable paintings in its collection, and is a flagship painting for the "Collection of Polish paintings prior to 1914". Its primary component is the contrast between the solemn jester (the titular Stańczyk) and the lively ball going on in the background. The painting has created an image of Stańczyk that has become iconic and widely recognized in Poland.

Stańczyk

Stańczyk, the male figure depicted in the painting, was the court jester when Poland was at the height of its political, economic and cultural power during the era of the Renaissance in Poland, during the reign of King Sigismund I the Old (reigned 1506–1548). He was a popular figure; besides his fame as a jester he has been described as an eloquent, witty, and intelligent man, using satire to comment on the nation's past, present, and future. Unlike jesters of other European courts, Stańczyk has always been considered as much more than a mere entertainer. Stańczyk's fame and legend were strong in his own time and enjoyed a resurgence in the 19th century, and he remains well known to this day.

Scarcity of sources gave rise to four distinct hypotheses about Stańczyk in the 19th century: that he was entirely invented by Jan Kochanowski and his colleagues, that he was "perhaps a typical jester dressed by his contemporaries in an Aesopian attire, perhaps a Shakespearean vision of 19th-century writers, or perhaps indeed a grey eminence of the societatis ioculatorum". In any measure, consensus among modern scholars is that such a person indeed existed and even if he did not, the figure had a tremendous importance to Polish culture of later centuries, appearing in works of many artists of the 19th and 20th centuries. He appears in a work of, among others, Julian Ursyn Niemcewicz (in Jan z Tęczna. Powieść historyczna, 1825) and several works by Józef Ignacy Kraszewski (1839, 1841).

Content
The full title of the painting is Stańczyk w czasie balu na dworze królowej Bony wobec straconego Smoleńska (Stańczyk during a ball at the court of Queen Bona in the face of the loss of Smolensk).

The primary composition of the painting is in the contrast between the solemn jester (Stańczyk) – the focus of the painting – and the lively ball going on in the background. Stańczyk is shown sitting alone in a dark room, while a ball, hosted by the royal family, is in full swing in the neighbouring hall. His appearance is unlike that one would expect in a jester – gloomy, deep in thought. His seriousness is reinforced by his accessories: his marotte lies discarded on the floor, whereas a holy medallion of the Black Madonna of Częstochowa can be seen on his torso. The wrinkled carpet at Stańczyk's feet could have been formed by his collapsing heavily into the chair upon reading the letter, or through a nervous shifting of the feet thereafter. On the table lies a letter likely announcing that the Grand Duchy of Lithuania has lost Smolensk (now in Russia) to the Grand Duchy of Moscow, causing Stańczyk's sorrow and reflection on his fatherland's fate. The letter seems to have been discarded by some official, and only the jester realizes its significance – while the rulers are partying, celebrating the recent victory at the Battle of Orsha, disregarding the bad news about Smolensk.  The letter bears the year 1533 (A.d. MDXXXIII) and the name "Samogitia", a province of the Commonwealth.  The note is incongruent with the actual date of the fall of Smolensk in 1514, and is a matter of ongoing debate, though an outright mistake by the meticulous Matejko, known for use of symbolism and iconography, is unlikely.  Another symbol, a lute, symbol of glory, is being carried by a court dwarf, stereotyped as a person of low stature and morale in Matejko's time; this suggests a decline of the Jagiellonian dynasty's fortunes. The window is thrown – or was blown – open, ruffling the tablecloth and alluding to an upset of the present order.  Through the open window, the darkened profile of Wawel Cathedral in Krakow is visible – the site of the coronation of Polish kings.  Next to it, a comet is seen – a portent of ill-fortune.  The imagery of downfall is completed with the inclusion of the three stars of Orion's Belt seen above and to the left of the cathedral spire.  In Greek mythology, Orion was a powerful hunter blinded by ego and his own greatness, but was ultimately brought down by the pinprick of a scorpion's sting.

History, significance and historiography

Matejko was fascinated by Stańczyk from the times of his youth, and portrayed him in several of his works (most notably, besides the painting discussed here, in Consecration of King Sigismund's Bell, 1874 and Prussian Homage, 1882). Working on this painting, Matejko was also inspired by the book Król zamczyska by Seweryn Goszczyński, whose main character – a loner, living in the castle's ruins, trying to reconcile past and present, and himself inspired by Stańczyk – likely influenced this painting. Completed in 1862, when Matejko was twenty-four years old, it is one of his most famous works and the one that launched him to fame. It is seen as a key painting for the understanding of Matejko's style and intentions in his art. Matejko used his own face for Stańczyk, and with this work began a series of paintings analyzing and interpreting the History of Poland through the figure of Stańczyk.

The painting is also seen as highly significant for the culture of Poland in general. According to the Warsaw National Museum, Stańczyk is one of the most recognizable paintings in its collection, and is a flagship painting for the "Collection of Polish paintings prior to 1914". The painting has created an image of Stańczyk that has become iconic and has been repeated in other works such as the play Wesele (1901) of Stanisław Wyspiański. Matejko's most famous paintings are usually large, group scenes; individual scenes are less common in his work.

Upon its creation, the painting did not gather much attention, and was acquired by the Kraków Society of Friends of Fine Arts for a purpose of a gift lottery. It was subsequently won by a certain individual, Korytko, in whose possession it was slightly damaged. Upon Matejko's rise to fame, the painting was rediscovered and applauded as a masterpiece, and acquired by the Warsaw National Museum in 1924. During World War II it was looted by the Nazis. It was subsequently seized by the Soviet Union and returned to Poland around 1956.

See also
 Art in Poland

Notes

References

1862 paintings
Portraits by Jan Matejko
Portraits of historical figures
Cultural depictions of Stańczyk
Nazi-looted art
Paintings in the collection of the National Museum, Warsaw
Oil on canvas paintings